Hope is the second studio album by American singer-songwriter Shamir, self-released on SoundCloud on April 17, 2017.

Released with no promotion or label support, the album was recorded over a weekend in which Shamir had considered quitting music.

Track listing
 "Hope"
 "What Else"
 "Ignore Everything"
 "Tom Kelly"
 "Easier"
 "Like a Bird"
 "One More Time Won't Kill You"
 "I Fucking Hate You"
 "Rain" (Blake Babies cover)
 "Bleed It Out"

References

2017 albums
Shamir (musician) albums